Dendrocoryne may refer to:

 Dendrocoryne, a synonym for a genus of orchids, Dendrobium
 Dendrocoryne, a synonym for a genus of hydrozoans, Solanderia